Achille Zavatta (6 May 1915 – 16 November 1993) was a French clown, artist and circus operator.

Biography
Zavatta was born in La Goulette, Tunisia, the son of Federico Zavatta, a circus owner. He started performing in his family's circus show at the age of three, forming with his brothers Michel and Rolph, the Zavatta Trio. He was the interval act at the 1962 Eurovision Song Contest in Luxemburg. To this day the Zavatta Circus tours France and surrounding countries, these performances include live tiger acts, which means the circus cannot tour Britain under the Animal Welfare Act. The circus is rated as a top show in France.

He became famous for his skills as a pantomime.

He committed suicide in 1993 in Ouzouer-des-Champs, Loiret and was interred in the Père Lachaise Cemetery in Paris.

Filmography

References

External links

 
 Achille Zavatta en clown

1915 births
1993 deaths
Tunisian emigrants to France
Burials at Père Lachaise Cemetery
French circus performers
Suicides by firearm in France
French clowns
French people of Italian descent
French mimes
1993 suicides